{{Automatic taxobox 
| image = Pseudorhombus arsius Suzini 91.jpg
| image_caption = Pseudorhombus arsius
| taxon = Pseudorhombus
| authority = Bleeker, 1862
| type_species = Rhombus polyspilos
| type_species_authority = Bleeker 1853
| synonyms = *Istiorhombus Whitley, 1931
Neorhombus Castelnau, 1875
Rhombiscus Jordan & Snyder, 1900Opinirhombus Ōshima, 1927Teratorhombus Macleay, 1881
}}Pseudorhombus is a genus of large-tooth flounders. With the exception of P. binii found off Peru, species in this genus are native to the Indo-Pacific. The largest species reaches  in length.

Species
There are currently 24 recognized species in this genus:
 Pseudorhombus annulatus Norman, 1927 (Ringed flounder)
 Pseudorhombus argus M. C. W. Weber, 1913 (Peacock flounder)
 Pseudorhombus arsius (F. Hamilton, 1822) (Largetooth flounder)
 Pseudorhombus binii Tortonese, 1955
 Pseudorhombus cinnamoneus (Temminck & Schlegel, 1846) (Cinnamon flounder)
 Pseudorhombus ctenosquamis (Ōshima, 1927)
 Pseudorhombus diplospilus Norman, 1926 (Four twin-spot flounder)
 Pseudorhombus dupliciocellatus Regan, 1905 (Ocellated flounder)
 Pseudorhombus elevatus J. D. Ogilby, 1912 (Deep flounder)
 Pseudorhombus javanicus (Bleeker, 1853) (Javan flounder)
 Pseudorhombus jenynsii (Bleeker, 1855) (Small-toothed flounder)
 Pseudorhombus levisquamis (Ōshima, 1927)
 Pseudorhombus malayanus Bleeker, 1865 (Malayan flounder)
 Pseudorhombus megalops Fowler, 1934
 Pseudorhombus micrognathus Norman, 1927
 Pseudorhombus natalensis Gilchrist, 1904 (Natal flounder)
 Pseudorhombus neglectus Bleeker, 1865
 Pseudorhombus oculocirris Amaoka, 1969
 Pseudorhombus oligodon (Bleeker, 1854) (Roughscale flounder)
 Pseudorhombus pentophthalmus Günther, 1862 (Fivespot flounder)
 Pseudorhombus quinquocellatus M. C. W. Weber & de Beaufort, 1929 (Five-eyed flounder)
 Pseudorhombus spinosus McCulloch, 1914 (Spiny flounder)
 Pseudorhombus tenuirastrum (Waite, 1899)
 Pseudorhombus triocellatus'' (Bloch & J. G. Schneider, 1801) (Three spotted flounder)

References

Paralichthyidae
Taxa named by Pieter Bleeker
Marine fish genera